Maing is a commune in the Nord department, northern France.

Fontenelle Abbey was located here.

Heraldry

See also
Communes of the Nord department

References

Communes of Nord (French department)